The King's Singers are a British a cappella vocal ensemble founded in 1968. They are named after King's College in Cambridge, England, where the group was formed by six choral scholars. In the United Kingdom, their popularity peaked in the 1970s and early 1980s. Thereafter they began to reach a wider American audience, appearing frequently on The Tonight Show Starring Johnny Carson in the United States. In 1987, they were prominently featured as guests on the Emmy Award-winning ABC television special Julie Andrews: The Sound of Christmas.

Today the ensemble travels worldwide for its performances, appearing in around 125 concerts each year, mostly in Europe, the US and East Asia, having recently added the People's Republic of China to their list of touring territories. In recent years the group has had several UK appearances at the Royal Albert Hall Proms and concerts as part of the Three Choirs Festival and the City of London Festival. The King's Singers consist of two countertenors, a tenor, a bass and two baritones. Their latest album is titled "The Library Vol. 4", and was released in June 2022.

History
The group has always consisted of six singers in total, with their membership changing over the years. None of the original members remain. The first stable incarnation of the group, from late 1969 until 1978, comprised:
 Nigel Perrin (countertenor 1)
 Alastair Hume (countertenor 2)
 Alastair Thompson (tenor)
 Anthony Holt (baritone 1) (actually from Christ Church, Oxford, rather than King's)
 Simon Carrington (baritone 2)
 Brian Kay (bass)

The current ensemble is composed of (starting year in brackets):
 Patrick Dunachie (countertenor 1) – (2016)
 Edward Button (countertenor 2) – (2019)
 Julian Gregory (tenor) – (2014)
 Christopher Bruerton (baritone 1) – (2012)
 Nick Ashby (baritone 2) – (2019)
 Jonathan Howard (bass) – (2010)

Former members of the King's Singers also include Jeremy Jackman, Bob Chilcott, Nigel Short, Bill Ives, Bruce Russell, Colin Mason, Gabriel Crouch, Stephen Connolly, Robin Tyson, Philip Lawson, Paul Phoenix, David Hurley, Christopher Gabbitas and Timothy Wayne-Wright. There have been 26 members of the King's Singers since the original stable group was established in late 1969, for whom the average length of tenure is around 12 years.

Around the year 2000, the King's Singers briefly called themselves king'singers (with a lower case k and a single s), as can be seen on the cover of Fire-Water and several song sheets.  This name change did not last long.

Early years
Prior to the establishment of the original stable male-only group cited above, several of the parts were taken by other singers, including three females. The four founding members, who first sang together within a six-man group in 1965, were Alastair Hume, Alastair Thompson, Simon Carrington and Brian Kay. From 1965 until 1968, the first countertenor was Martin Lane and the first baritone was Richard Salter. It was this group of six singers who gave the first concert under the name of the King's Singers on 1 May 1968 at the Queen Elizabeth Hall, London, with the Academy of St Martin-in-the-Fields, Simon Preston (organ) and Barry Tuckwell (horn). Later in 1968, Martin Lane developed a brain tumour and had to withdraw from the group; Felicity Palmer stood in during 1969 until Nigel Perrin graduated that summer. Then, in 1969, Richard Salter was awarded a Richard Tauber Scholarship and left for Vienna; Nigel Beavan filled the gap until Anthony Holt became available towards the end of the year. Other singers who served as short-term group members were Eleanor Capp, Caryl Newnham and, on one occasion, James Bowman, all of whom took the first countertenor (soprano) role in 1969 when Felicity Palmer was unavailable. For a brief time after he joined the King's Singers, Nigel Perrin also belonged to the Scholars; when double-booked, his King's Singers' duties were fulfilled by Richard Baker (note: not the familiar BBC broadcaster). Neil Jenkins sang tenor in the early pre-King's Singers group's first summer singing tour in 1965, and Peter Hall was another tenor used by the fledgling pre-King's Singers group.

Madrigal History Tour
In 1984, the members of the King's Singers (who at the time included three founding members: Alastair Hume, Anthony Holt, and Simon Carrington) presented, narrated and sang in Madrigal History Tour, a six-part BBC television documentary series about the history of the madrigal in Western Europe. (The name was a play on the Beatles album Magical Mystery Tour.) The series also featured the early music ensemble the Consort of Musicke, playing together with and separately from the King's Singers. The series was accompanied by an album, also called Madrigal History Tour.

20th anniversary
The King's Singers' 20th anniversary concert in 1988, at the Barbican, featured a surprise reunion, in which all King's Singers to date reunited on stage, introduced individually (with membership dates, counting from 1968) by Prunella Scales.

40th anniversary
Fortieth anniversary celebration concerts included two "best of" concerts at Cadogan Hall, London, on 30 April 2008, and a performance the following day in the chapel of King's College Cambridge, as well as concerts in Paris, Rome, Berlin, New York and Tokyo.

50th anniversary 
The King's Singers 50th anniversary was celebrated in 2018 with a special concert at Carnegie Hall, and the release of a new album, Gold.

Concert cancellation 
In February 2023, Pensacola Christian College cancelled the group's concert with two hours notice.

Influences
The group cites as its influences the Hi-Lo's vocal jazz group, the Comedian Harmonists, the Mastersingers and (perhaps most importantly) the style of singing instilled into them by Sir David Willcocks, their director of music at King's College, Cambridge. It was this serene and precise sound, with vibrato used only as a colour rather than a default setting, that was expanded by the early King's Singers to be used on all genres of music, from Renaissance church repertoire such as they had performed as part of the daily chapel services at the university, to pop, jazz, folk and spiritual arrangements that were soon added to their concert programmes.

The group has also inspired musicians in other countries to create similar ensembles, such as Affabre Concinui in Poland.

Repertoire
The King's Singers took hold of the idea that concerts need not contain merely one form of music; audiences could be educated as well as entertained. For those who came expecting pop music there would be classical music as well, and vice versa. This started out of necessity; for their first few concerts the group simply had to perform everything they knew in order to fill a concert programme, and this included religious music from their chapel library, along with folksongs and other "lollipops." Over the years their library has expanded so that it now includes some 2,000 works of all styles. The group is best known for its a cappella performances which have as a foundation a strong bass/baritone blend on which the other voices sit, a principle known as the "Pyramid of Sound". They say the 'added' baritone creates more width and depth to their sound. The two baritones and bass allow the top three parts to sit on top of the bed of sound created for them and, given that higher-pitched voices are heard more easily, the effect to the audience is one of complete balance in the overall chordal sound, despite being 'outnumbered' by their lower-pitched colleagues. In addition, the King's Singers have frequently performed with instruments, both in recordings and in concert. One of their most famous songs is "You Are The New Day." They have appeared in many venues, including the famous City Varieties Theatre Leeds, with many appearances on BBC TV's long running Music Hall variety programme, The Good Old Days. They have also appeared on TV in concert with Hinge and Bracket.

Concert structure
Most of their a cappella concerts are divided into five distinct groups of pieces. The first four vary widely (madrigals, folk songs, recently commissioned pieces, etc.) but are generally taken from the serious side of the group's repertoire, but the last group of the concert is typically a "close harmony" set. Often it consists of lighter fare, including music of The Beatles, Billy Joel, Queen, George Gershwin, Harold Arlen or Irving Berlin, many of which have been arranged for the group by composers such as Richard Rodney Bennett, Jeremy Lubbock, Bob Chilcott, Philip Lawson and John Rutter. Sometimes the final set (in a concert of religious music) will be a spiritual harmony set – entitled "Songs of Faith and Hope". This set could be composed of American Spirituals, arranged by contemporary composers, including former group members Philip Lawson and Bob Chilcott. Pieces in this set could include "Simple Gifts", "Deep River", "Down to the River to Pray", and "Stand Still Jordan" as well as more spiritual pop songs such as "Some Folks Lives Roll Easy" by Paul Simon.

More recently, however, the King's Singers have begun to perform "concept programmes" which have a set theme running throughout. These could be simply a 60-minute first-half sequence, often performed in European cathedral concerts, with a Mass or Requiem setting providing the backbone, interspersed with other shorter works, or a more fundamental concept which infuses every piece performed. Examples of this latter art include "Sacred Bridges", a programme of Jewish, Islamic and Christian settings of Psalms, performed with Vladimir Ivanoff and his ensemble "Saraband". The group have also created concert programmes relating to recent CD recordings, including "Landscape and Time" and "Treason and Dischord", the latter a programme commemorating the 400th anniversary of the Gunpowder Plot and including a script read in live performances by actors Joss Ackland and Bill Wallis. The group works closely with concert promoters and local agents to determine the best possible programme for each concert, whether for church, concert hall, open-air venue or private house.

Modern repertoire
The King's Singers are also known for frequently commissioning works from contemporary composers. Starting with "Timepiece", commissioned by the Camden Festival in 1972 from composer Paul Patterson (and still regularly performed today), they have continued by commissioning pieces from (amongst others) Sally Beamish, Bob Chilcott, Sir Peter Maxwell Davies, Howard Goodall, Daron Hagen, Jackson Hill, Graham Lack, Libby Larsen, György Ligeti, John McCabe, Ivan Moody, Jocelyn Pook, Geoffrey Poole, Francis Pott, Ned Rorem, Joby Talbot, Sir John Tavener and Malcolm Williamson. In 2008 they performed a piece commissioned jointly for them and the National Youth Choirs of Great Britain written by Eric Whitacre.

Awards
In February 2009, the King's Singers' CD, Simple Gifts, won a Grammy Award for Best Classical Crossover Album. In February 2012, they won Best Choral Performance at the 54th Grammy Awards along with Eric Whitacre for the album Light and Gold, on which they performed "The Stolen Child", written for the group by Whitacre. Their DVD, "Live at the BBC Proms", won a MIDEM Award at the annual ceremony in Cannes in 2010 for Best DVD Performance. In 2013 the group was inducted into the Gramophone Hall of Fame.

Activities of former members
Many former members of the King's Singers have remained active in the world of choral music. Former tenor Bob Chilcott is now a composer, conductor of the BBC Singers and workshop leader. Former baritone Gabriel Crouch is now the director of choral ensembles at Princeton University and former countertenor Nigel Short founded a professional choir, Tenebrae, on leaving the group in 2001. Former tenor, Bill Ives, is a composer and arranger, and for 18 years was fellow and tutor in music at Magdalen College, Oxford, where he directed the choir. Robin Tyson runs the artist management company at Edition Peters. Former bass Stephen Connolly runs his residential International A Cappella School (IAS) every summer in the UK and also travels the world delivering choral workshops and masterclasses. Baritone Simon Carrington is director emeritus of the Yale Schola Cantorum at the Yale Institute for Sacred Music and now directs the Simon Carrington Singers based in Kansas City, Missouri. Tony Holt is on the music faculty at St. Olaf College as a voice instructor. The original bass, Brian Kay, became well-known as a radio and TV broadcaster; Bruce Russell is now vicar of St Francis' Church, Langley, in Berkshire. Paul Phoenix founded his own consultancy, PurpleVocals, and in September 2019 opened the Paul Phoenix Academy, his own private music school in Hong Kong. As executive director he directs instrumental and composition tuition. Philip Lawson is active as a composer, arranger, workshop leader, and conductor. Since 2016 he has been musical director of the Romsey Singers

Educational activities
In addition to recording and performing, the King's Singers have a commitment to education, often participating in master classes and workshops. Every two years they hold a residency at the Schleswig-Holstein Music Festival in Lübeck, Germany, at which up to 12 a cappella groups from all over the world are taught over a period of four days, culminating in a public performance. The group also leads around a dozen additional one-off masterclasses throughout the year, normally in conjunction with concert performances and often as part of their twice-yearly US tours. During its time, the King's Singers have taught many groups that have now become known in their own right, such as Club for Five, The Real Group, Rajaton, Singer Pur and Calmus Ensemble.

Several of the King's Singers also arranged pieces, both for the group and pieces to publish in their line of music. Recently, Philip Lawson and Bob Chilcott have been the most prolific composers for the group.

The group established The King's Singers Summer School in 2013 taking place on campus at Royal Holloway, University of London. The Summer School took place for a second time in 2015 and saw composer and conductor Eric Whitacre and Eton Choirbook expert Dr. Stephen Darlington as special guests. In 2017, the Summer School participants performed an Evensong at the St George's Chapel, under the direction of Christopher Robinson. The first US Summer School took place between 13 and 19 June 2017 at DePauw University, Indiana followed by the third School at Royal Holloway on 17–22 July 2017. The King's Singers were joined by guest clinician and former King's Singers Bob Chilcott.

Personnel

Members

Current members
 Patrick Dunachie – 1st Countertenor (2016–present)
 Edward Button – 2nd Countertenor (2019–present)
 Julian Gregory – Tenor (2014–present)
 Christopher Bruerton – 1st Baritone (2012–present)
 Nick Ashby – 2nd Baritone (2019–present)
 Jonathan Howard – Bass (2010–present)

Former members
 Martin Lane – 1st Countertenor (1968–1969)
 Nigel Perrin – 1st Countertenor (1969–1980)
 Jeremy Jackman – 1st Countertenor (1980–1990)
 David Hurley – 1st Countertenor (1990–2016)
 Alastair Hume – 2nd Countertenor  (1968–1993)
 Nigel Short – 2nd Countertenor (1994–2000)
 Robin Tyson – 2nd Countertenor (2001–2009)
 Timothy Wayne-Wright – 2nd Countertenor (2009–2018)
 Alastair Thompson – Tenor (1968–1978)
 Bill Ives – Tenor (1978–1985)
 Bob Chilcott – Tenor (1985–1997)
 Paul Phoenix – Tenor (1997–2014)
 Richard Salter – 1st Baritone (1968)
 Nigel Beaven – 1st Baritone (1968–1969)
 Anthony Holt – 1st Baritone (1969–1987)
 Bruce Russell – 1st Baritone (1988–1996)
 Philip Lawson – 2nd Baritone (1994–1996); 1st Baritone (1996–2012)
 Simon Carrington – 2nd Baritone (1968–1993)
 Gabriel Crouch – 2nd Baritone (1996–2004)
 Christopher Gabbitas – 2nd Baritone (2004–2018)
 Brian Kay – Bass (1968–1982)
 Colin Mason – Bass (1982–1987)
 Stephen Connolly – Bass (1988–2010)

Lineups

Lineup

Timeline

Discography
In 2003, the group signed with Signum Records, with whom they have now released eighteen recordings, including an experimental recording of Thomas Tallis' 40-part "Spem in Alium", using modern studio multi-tracking techniques to turn their six voices into 40, the results of which can be heard on a Signum CD and Iambic Productions DVD, which includes a documentary on the making of the CD.

The group's most successful recent CD is the 2008 Simple Gifts, a selection of 16 pop ballads, spirituals, and folk songs. It was their first full-length studio CD since the 1990s. The arrangements on the album are by former first baritone Philip Lawson, Peter Knight and former tenor Bob Chilcott, and the album was recorded at the home of Francis Rossi, of Status Quo, and engineered by Gregg Jackman, the brother of former King's Singers countertenor Jeremy Jackman. In February 2009 Simple Gifts won a Grammy Award for Best Classical Crossover Album. An EP recording, From the Heart, was released in 2010.

In December 2007, the King's Singers recorded a Christmas concert, Rejoice and Be Merry! with The Mormon Tabernacle Choir and Orchestra at Temple Square, that was released on CD on 30 September 2008; it also was released on DVD 21 October 2008.  The CD featured both a cappella and accompanied songs by the King's Singers and The Mormon Tabernacle Choir. Six tracks feature the King's Singers alone, with another five tracks featuring the combined King's Singer's and Mormon Tabernacle Choir, the remaining eight tracks feature The Mormon Tabernacle Choir.  The recorded concert was also broadcast on US PBS stations in December 2008. In 2011, the group released High Flight with The Concordia Choir, an album of music by three of the most popular 21st century choral composers, Eric Whitacre, Morten Lauridsen and former tenor in the group Bob Chilcott.

In October 2013, The King's Singers released Great American Songbook, an album dedicated to American Standards from the 1920s to the 1960s, to critical acclaim. The sound on this new album marks a departure from the more acoustic albums of the past decade, using extensive post-production techniques and multi-tracking to create a more modern a cappella sound, but retaining the essence of The King's Singers' blend and balance.

Many King's Singers arrangements have been published, including a number compiled into song books

References

External links
 The King's Singers' official website
 The King's Singers' official distributor

A cappella musical groups
Professional a cappella groups
Early music choirs
English vocal groups
Musical groups from Cambridge
Musical groups established in 1968
1968 establishments in England